Kylie Waterreus (born 22 March 1998) is a Dutch professional racing cyclist, who currently rides for UCI Women's Continental Team . She is the niece of former football goalkeeper Ronald Waterreus.

References

External links

1998 births
Living people
Dutch female cyclists
Place of birth missing (living people)
People from Meerssen
Cyclists from Limburg (Netherlands)
21st-century Dutch women